Montauk Point State Park is a  state park located in the hamlet of Montauk, at the eastern tip of Long Island in the Town of East Hampton, Suffolk County, New York.  Montauk Point is the easternmost extremity of the South Fork of Long Island, and thus also of New York State.

History
The park contains the Montauk Point Light, which was authorized by the Second Congress, under President George Washington in 1792. Construction began on June 7, 1796 and was completed on November 5, 1796. The lighthouse and adjacent Camp Hero were heavily fortified with huge guns during World War I and World War II.  Those gun emplacements and concrete observation bunkers (which are also at nearby Shadmoor State Park and Camp Hero State Park) are still visible.

The Amistad, a Spanish ship taken over by slaves in 1839, was captured by the USS Washington near Montauk Point.  The slaves were allowed to briefly disembark here before being re-imprisoned and taken to New London, Connecticut for trial.  The Amistad case was heard before the Supreme Court of the United States, where John Quincy Adams successfully argued that the slaves had been kidnapped. Following the trial, the slaves were permitted to return to Africa.  The case fanned the debate over the abolition of slavery.

Park description
Montauk Point State Park features picnic tables, a food concession, playground, fishing, seasonal hunting, and trails for hiking and cross-country skiing.

Suffolk Transit's S94 route also serves the park seasonally connecting it with Montauk Village. The park is located at the end of New York State Route 27.

In Literature
A memory of this district is related in Lydia Sigourney's poem Montauk Point, published in her Scenes in my Native Land, 1845.

Image gallery

See also
 List of New York state parks
 Lighthouses in the United States
 Montauk Point land claim

References

External links

 New York State Parks: Montauk Point State Park
 Montauklighthouse.com
 National Park Service List of New York Lighthouses

State parks of New York (state)
East Hampton (town), New York
Beaches of Suffolk County, New York
Robert Moses projects
Parks in Suffolk County, New York
Landforms of Suffolk County, New York